Širmanski Hrib is a dispersed settlement in the hills west of Litija in central Slovenia. The area is part of the traditional region of Lower Carniola. It is now included with the rest of the municipality in the Central Sava Statistical Region.

References

External links
Širmanski Hrib on Geopedia

Populated places in the Municipality of Litija